Vineuil is a commune neighboring the city of Blois, in the French department of Loir-et-Cher, Centre-Val de Loire.

Economy
Vineuil is an economical and industrial center of the vicinity of Blois. Specialized mainly in tertiary industries, it is home to five industrial zones and shopping centers such as Auchan.

Places

 Marcel Carné Secondary School (collège Marcel Carné)
 Notre Dame de Vineuil Elementary and Secondary School (école et collège Notre-Dame de Vineuil)
 Les Noëls
 Les Girards
 Blois Valley

Geography
The commune is traversed by the river Cosson.

Population

See also
Communes of the Loir-et-Cher department

References

Communes of Loir-et-Cher